Henri "Harry" Jean Joseph Derckx (19 March 1918 – 12 July 1983) was a Dutch field hockey player who competed at the 1948 and 1952 Summer Olympics as back. In 1948 he played all seven matches for the Dutch team that won the bronze medal. Four years later he again played all matches and won the silver medal.

References

External links
 

1918 births
1983 deaths
Dutch male field hockey players
Olympic field hockey players of the Netherlands
Field hockey players at the 1948 Summer Olympics
Field hockey players at the 1952 Summer Olympics
Olympic silver medalists for the Netherlands
Olympic bronze medalists for the Netherlands
Olympic medalists in field hockey
Sportspeople from Seine-et-Marne
Medalists at the 1952 Summer Olympics
Medalists at the 1948 Summer Olympics
20th-century Dutch people